The Church of St. John (Agios Ioannis) in Tirilye, known as the Dündar House in the area today, is a former Greek Orthodox church that has been transferred to private property after the Greek population left during the 1923 population exchange between Greece and Turkey. The three-storey western part of the church, which was constructed in the 19th century, is currently being used as a residence. The main entrance is through a stone door. There are Byzantine-style decorations and stone ornaments on its walls.

References

Eastern Orthodox church buildings in Turkey
Former churches in Turkey
Buildings and structures in Bursa Province